Bepoase is a community in the Ayensuano District formerly in the Fanteakwa District in the Eastern Region of Ghana.

Institutions 

 Bepoase Basic School
 Bepoase Police Station

References 

Eastern Region (Ghana)
Communities in Ghana